Bazaar E Husn is a 2014 Indian Hindi-language film, based on Munshi Premchand’s renowned Urdu novel Bazaar-e-Husn, released on 18 July 2014. This film stars Reshmi Ghosh, Jeet Goshwami, Om Puri and Yashpal Sharma, and was written by Dhananjay Kumar.

Cast
Renowned TV star Reshmi Ghosh features in Bazaar-e-Husn as Suman. While Om Puri plays the role of her father Kishenchand. Actors like Jeet Goshwami and Yashpal Sharma play pivotal roles in the film.

 Reshmi Ghosh as Suman
 Jeet Goshwami as Sadan
 Om Puri as Kishanchand
 Yashpal Sharma as Gajadhar
 Rajeshwari Sachdev as Didi

Music
"Pyaar Ki Duniya Basai Hai" - Udit Narayan, Kavita Krishnamurthy
"Har Shaam Nigaho Se Youn Jaam Chhalakte Hai" - Alka Yagnik, Kavita Krishnamurthy
"Maare Nainva K Baan" - Sunidhi Chauhan
"Toh Sang Raaji Nahi Balam Ji" - Bhaswati Ghosh
"Aaj Kaisi Ghadi Aai Hai Hamare Angana" - Bhaswati Ghosh
"Hamri Atariya Pe Aaja Sawariya" - Bhaswati Ghosh
"Jadugar More Naina Lute Dil Ka Chain" - Bhaswati Ghosh
"Aabru Laaj Saram" - Udit Narayan, Kavita Krishnamurthy

Reception 

 Bazaar-e-Husn: Banking on nostalgia By Johnson Thomas
 For soulful music and are a fan of Munshi Premchand, the film is worth watching once. By Jyoti venkatesh

References

External links
 
 Bazaar E Husn at movietalkies.com
 

2014 films
2010s Hindi-language films
Films scored by Khayyam
Adaptations of works by Premchand
Films based on works by Premchand